Jürgen Melzer (born 22 May 1981) is an Austrian former professional tennis player. Melzer reached a career-high singles ranking of world No. 8 in April 2011, and a doubles ranking of world No. 6 in September 2010. He has a younger brother, Gerald Melzer, with whom he played doubles in several tournaments.

In 1999, Melzer won the boys' singles title at Wimbledon. For many years, he was known as one of the best players on the tour not to have progressed past the third round of a major. He ended this by reaching the semifinals of the 2010 French Open, losing to Rafael Nadal after coming from two sets down to defeat Novak Djokovic in the quarterfinals. As of June 2022, he remains the only person to defeat Djokovic from two sets down.

Melzer had greater success in doubles, winning the men's doubles title at the 2010 Wimbledon Championships and the 2011 US Open partnering Philipp Petzschner, as well as the mixed doubles title at the 2011 Wimbledon Championships partnering Iveta Benešová (whom he would later marry and divorce).

Career

Personal life
Melzer married Iveta Benešová, a WTA Tour tennis player, on 14 September 2012 and divorced in 2015. Melzer is a left-handed tennis player, but is right-handed in everyday life.

Junior career
Melzer played his first junior match in September 1995 at the age of 14 at a Grade-3 tournament in Austria.

At the 1999 Australian Open, Melzer won the doubles draw partnering singles champion Kristian Pless. Then, at the 1999 Wimbledon Championships. He won the singles draw defeating junior world No. 1 and doubles partner, Kristian Pless, in the final.

Melzer ended his junior career after his Wimbledon victory. Throughout his junior career, he reached as high as world No. 26 in 1998 (and No. 24 in doubles) and posted a win–loss record of 52–26 in singles and 47–23 in doubles.

Junior Grand Slam results - Singles:

Australian Open: 3R (1999)
French Open: 1R (1998)
Wimbledon: W (1999)
US Open: 2R (1998)

Junior Grand Slam results - Doubles:

Australian Open: W (1999)
French Open: 1R (1998)
Wimbledon: QF (1999)
US Open: 1R (1998)

Early years
In 1998, Melzer started playing in Futures in his country, where he won his first two matches, but lost the next four.

In 1999, he started playing outside of Austria in Futures and Challengers. He competed in his first main-draw match in the 1999 CA-TennisTrophy in Vienna, Austria, where he defeated Lars Burgsmüller, before losing to then world No. 11, Nicolas Kiefer, in two sets.

In 2000, Melzer continued playing in Futures and Challengers, but was only able to reach one quarterfinal. He also made his Grand Slam debut at the Wimbledon Championships, but lost to Australian Mark Philippoussis in four sets.

In 2001, he reach his first Futures final event at Poprad, Slovakia, losing to Juraj Hasko. However, he captured his first title at the Challenger in Mönchengladbach, Germany over local hero Jens Knippschild in three sets. He had his first top-100 and top-20 win over Fabrice Santoro, then world No. 18 in the CA-TennisTrophy, but lost in the next round to Michel Kratochvil in two tiebreaks.

In 2002, he regularly competed in Challenger events, reaching two finals, but losing in both attempts to Alexander Popp in Heilbronn, Germany and to Luis Horna in Fürth, Germany. He reached his first ATP Tour quarterfinal in the Internationaler Raiffeisen Grand Prix, defeating Sargis Sargsian and Andrea Gaudenzi in straight sets, before losing to eventual champion Nicolás Lapentti. However, he did better in the Croatia Open by reaching the semifinals, defeating Vincent Spadea, Agustín Calleri, and Victor Hănescu, before losing to eventual champion Carlos Moyá. He also won his first Grand Slam match at the US Open over Jack Brasington, before losing to Nicolás Massú in four sets. At the Vienna Open, he earned one of the biggest wins of his career by defeating then world No. 2, Tommy Haas, to reach the quarterfinals, before losing to Jiří Novák in two sets.

The start of 2003 was not a good one for the Austrian, as he lost three consecutive Tour-level main-draw matches, including his Australian Open debut. He rebounded in April by reaching the semifinals, losing to then world No. 2 Andre Agassi. He also made his French Open debut, but lost to David Ferrer. At Wimbledon, Melzer upset then world No. 15, Fernando González, to earn his first Wimbledon victory, but lost to Jonas Björkman in four sets the following round. Melzer reached his first ATP Tour final at the Hall of Fame Tennis Championships without defeating a player in the top 100, but lost to Robby Ginepri in the final. In the US Open, Melzer reached the second round again, but lost Juan Carlos Ferrero. He earned another top-20 victory over Tommy Robredo in the Vienna Open.

2004–2006
In 2004, the Austrian reached his first third round of a Grand Slam at the Australian Open with victories over Tomas Behrend, and Galo Blanco, before losing to Sjeng Schalken. Melzer made his Master Series debut at Indian Wells, losing to Victor Hănescu. He then won his first Master Series matches at the Miami Masters with victories over Ivo Karlović, and then world No. 8, Tim Henman, but lost to Todd Martin in straight sets in the third round. He next reached the quarterfinals of the Hamburg Masters with victories over Nicolás Massú, Irakli Labadze, and Marat Safin, but lost to former world No. 1, Lleyton Hewitt. Melzer then reached the semifinals of the Internationaler Raiffeisen Grand Prix, losing to Xavier Malisse in three sets. He then won his first French Open match over Wayne Ferreira, but then lost to Lleyton Hewitt in four sets.

In the Canada Masters, he reached the quarterfinals, losing to Nicolas Kiefer, with straight-set victories over Andre Agassi and Fernando González. In the US Open, he reached the third round for the first time, but lost to Michaël Llodra. In his last tournament of the year, he reached the third round of the Paris Masters, losing to Marat Safin in straight sets.

In 2005, he reached the quarterfinals of the Adelaide International, losing to Juan Ignacio Chela. In the Australian Open he reached the third round, losing to then world No. 2, Andy Roddick, in a tough three-setter. At the SAP Open, he lost in the semifinals to Cyril Saulnier, but earned his third victory over Andre Agassi en route. He reached his second semifinal of the year at the U.S. Clay Court Championships, but lost to Andy Roddick. He reached his second ATP tour final at the Hypo Group Tennis International, but lost to Nikolay Davydenko in three sets. At Roand Garros and Wimbledon, Melzer reached the third round and lost to Guillermo Coria on both occasions. He then lost six straight main-draw matches in the Austrian Open to Fernando Verdasco, and the Rogers Cup, Cincinnati Masters, New Haven Open, US Open, and Open de Moselle. He then continued his bad run with second-round losses at the Vienna Open, the Madrid Masters, and the St. Petersburg Open.

In 2006, he continued his bad run with a 1–8 record and a seven-match losing streak in the first three months, with his only win coming in the Medibank International over Juan Ignacio Chela. He then rebounded in the U.S. Clay Court Championships, where he reached his third final without dropping a set, but lost to Mardy Fish. He also reached the semifinals of the BMW Open, losing to eventual champion Olivier Rochus, and the quarterfinals of the Hypo Group Tennis International, losing to Jiří Novák. However, he fell in the first rounds of the French Open and Wimbledon. At the Hall of Fame Open, he reached the semifinals, but was upset by eventual champion Mark Philippoussis. He also reached the quarterfinals of the Austrian Open and the New Haven Open. He then suffered two losses to Juan Mónaco in the third round of the Mercedes Cup and the first round of the Warsaw Open. At the US Open, he lost to Alessio di Mauro, thus not winning a single Grand Slam match in the year. He then reached back-to-back finals at the Romanian Open and the Open de Moselle. He won his first ATP Tour title at the Romania Open]], defeating Filippo Volandri in straight sets in the final, with victories over Gilles Simon and Paul-Henri Mathieu. At the Open de Moselle, he lost to Novak Djokovic. He ended the year with a quarterfinal showing at the Vienna Open, losing to Andy Roddick, but earned his first win over Juan Carlos Ferrero. He made a first-round exit at the St. Petersburg Open, losing to Lukáš Dlouhý.

2007–2009
In 2007, Melzer began the year with a first-round exit at the Qatar Open and a semifinal exit at the Medibank International, withdrawing against James Blake. Melzer reached the second rounds of the Australian Open, the M.K. Championships, the Indian Wells Masters, and the Miami Masters. He also reached the final of the Tennis Channel Open, losing to Lleyton Hewitt. He also reached the quarterfinals of the U.S. Clay Court Championships and the BMW Open. In the Masters Series on clay, he lost in the first rounds of the Monte Carlo Masters and the Rome Masters, and the third round of the Hamburg Masters, losing to Fernando González. After that, he suffered back-to-back losses to Juan Mónaco in the Hypo Group Tennis International and the French Open. He then suffered a left wrist injury in his first-round loss to Nikolay Davydenko in the Gerry Weber Open which caused him to miss two months of tennis, including Wimbledon. He came back at the Cincinnati Masters, reaching the third round and losing to Lleyton Hewitt. From then on, he was unable to secure back-to-back wins.

In 2008, Melzer reached the second round of his first three tournaments, including the Australian Open. He again failed to secure back-to-back wins, compiling a 3–9 record in his next nine tournaments and putting him out of the top 100 since April 2003. It was not until the Hypo Group Tennis International that he recorded back-to-back wins by reaching the quarterfinals, losing to Igor Kunitsyn in three sets. He carried his good performance through the French Open with a third-round exit to Frenchman Gaël Monfils, having led two sets to one. On grass, he was able to reach the quarterfinals of the Ordina Open and the third round at Wimbledon. He then returned to clay at the Austrian Open and reached his seventh final, but lost once again to Juan Martín del Potro. Melzer made a good performance at the Beijing Olympics by reaching the final eight, losing to eventual gold medalist Rafael Nadal. He then had a good performance by reaching the third rounds of the Pilot Pen Tennis and the US Open. Melzer made a good year end with quarterfinal results in the Thailand Open and the Vienna Open, which put him back to the top 40.

In 2009, Melzer again made a poor first quarter of the year, only managing one back-to-back win in his first ten tournaments, and it was at the Australian Open, where he reached the third round, losing to Andy Murray. It was not until the Italian Open that he recorded back-to-back wins, including a win over Nikolay Davydenko, but lost to Fernando González in the following round. He then reached the quarterfinals of the Austrian Open and the Gerry Weber Open once again, and the third round of the French Open and Wimbledon for the second year in a row. He reach his first semifinal of a year at the Croatia Open, but lost to eventual champion Nikolay Davydenko. He also reached the quarterfinals of the Pilot Pen Tennis with a victory over Victor Hănescu, but lost in the following round to Fernando Verdasco. In the semifinal of Thailand Open Melzer lost to eventual champion Gilles Simon in two sets. At the Shanghai Masters, Melzer defeated a then-world No. 5, Juan Martín del Potro, before losing to Feliciano López. This was his second victory over a top-5 player. The first was his win over a then-world No. 2, Tommy Haas, in 2002. He ended 2009 on a high note by winning his second career title at the Bank Austria-TennisTrophy over Marin Čilić in straight sets, which included a victory over Radek Štěpánek in the quarterfinals.

2010: French Open semi-final, top 10 doubles debut

Melzer lost in the first round of the Australian Open at the start of the season, but then reached the semifinals in Zagreb, losing to defending/eventual champion Marin Čilić. After a quarterfinal appearance in Rotterdam, where he lost to Nikolay Davydenko, Melzer reached the semifinals in Dubai, where he lost to Mikhail Youzhny. Later in the year, Melzer reached the quarterfinals of the ATP Masters 1000 in Madrid, losing to Nicolás Almagro. Melzer followed this up with his best result in a Grand Slam to date by reaching the semifinals of the French Open. He beat Dudi Sela and Nicolas Mahut before he caused a significant upset by defeating ninth seed David Ferrer in straight sets, followed by a four-set win over Teymuraz Gabashvili (who had beaten Andy Roddick in the previous round), and by a five set triumph over Novak Djokovic, coming back from a two-set deficit for the first time in his career. He was eventually defeated by four-time champion Rafael Nadal, in straight sets.

Melzer followed this up by reaching the fourth round of Wimbledon, where he was defeated by Roger Federer in their first career meeting. However, at the same tournament, he achieved his greatest success by winning the doubles title with German partner Philipp Petzschner.

After playing a few clay-court tournaments, reaching the final in one, and having good results in the others, Melzer moved on to the hard-court season, losing to Peter Polansky in the first round of Montreal and Ernests Gulbis in the second round of Cincinnati. He then played the US Open, where he reached the fourth round for the third consecutive Grand Slam tournament, having never been past the third round prior to the French Open. He played Roger Federer for a spot in the quarterfinals, having also played him in the fourth round of Wimbledon. Federer once again defeated him in straight sets.

At the Shanghai Masters in October, Melzer recorded one of the biggest wins of his career against world No. 1, Rafael Nadal. This was Melzer's first victory against Nadal and the first time he had beaten a reigning no. 1. He then lost to Argentina's Juan Mónaco in the quarterfinals.

In the last week of October, he won his third career title, defending his 2009 victory at the Vienna Open against his compatriot Andreas Haider-Maurer in a thrilling final; coming back from a set and a break down at 4–5 down (Haider-Maurer serving at 15–0) and three points away from defeat, to put up a heroic comeback and clinch the three set epic victory.

On 3 November, he was named Austrian Sportsman of the Year.

Melzer's final tournament of the year as a singles player was the Paris Masters, where he advanced to the quarterfinals, before losing to world No. 2, Roger Federer.

As a result of winning the Wimbledon doubles championship, Melzer and his doubles partner Petzschner qualified for a doubles team spot in the ATP Tour Finals, but his bid to qualify as a singles player ended when Andy Roddick defeated Ernests Gulbis in the third round of the Paris Masters, giving Roddick an insurmountable lead in qualifying points for the last individual spot in the ATP World Tour Finals.

2011: Top 10 debut in singles

Melzer started the year at the Australian Open. He reached the third round without dropping a set, before defeating 21st seed Marcos Baghdatis in the third round after Baghdatis retired with Melzer leading. He was defeated by Andy Murray in the fourth round. Despite the loss, Melzer cracked the top 10 for the first time in his career.

Since then, Melzer failed to chalk up any back-to-back wins until appearing at the Monte-Carlo Masters. Seeded ninth, he finally won consecutive matches as he beat Robin Haase, and Nicolás Almagro, to reach the quarterfinals for the first time in this tournament. There, he pulled off a surprise two-set win over No. 3 ranked and second seed Roger Federer to reach the semifinal stage for the first time in an ATP Masters 1000 tournament. However, he failed to reach his first final in such a tournament after losing against David Ferrer.

In the 2011 US Open men's doubles final, he arguably had his greatest success of the year when he and his doubles partner Philipp Petzschner won a controversial decision over the Polish team of Mariusz Fyrstenberg and Marcin Matkowski to claim the trophy. During a net exchange, a ball ricocheted off Petzschner's left shin, though he denied it. Instant replay of the telecast clearly confirmed the illegal return. Jurgen/Petzschner broke through in that game and won the match in straight sets, splitting a $420,000 purse.

2012
In singles, Melzer had an inauspicious start to the year, exiting in the first round in Brisbane and the Australian Open. He did make the final in Brisbane in doubles, partnering Philipp Petzschner, and he won the tournament in Memphis against Canadian Milos Raonic.

In Monte Carlo, he made the quarterfinals in doubles, partnering Florian Mayer. After that, he had a series of quick exits in singles: the first round at the French Open, the second at Wimbledon, and the first at the US Open. However, he made it to the semifinals at Wimbledon in doubles.

He partnered with Leander Paes in Canada and made it to the semifinals, losing to the Bryan brothers.

The fall went somewhat better in singles, with a quarterfinal showing in Shanghai and a semifinal in Valencia. He also made quarterfinal showings in Beijing and Shanghai and a semifinal in Vienna, with various partners. However, the Paris Masters was back to a first-round exit in singles against Grigor Dimitrov and a first-match defeat in doubles.

2013
Melzer made the quarterfinals in Brisbane, where he was eliminated by Grigor Dimitrov. At the Australian Open, he was defeated in the third round in straight sets by Tomáš Berdych.

He made the final in Zagreb, only to lose to Marin Čilić in straight sets. He went out in the first round at Indian Wells, but made it to the quarterfinals in Miami, losing to David Ferrer in three sets. He was eliminated in the third round at Monte Carlo by Jo-Wilfried Tsonga.

He made a quick first-round exit at the French Open, but made it to the fourth round at Wimbledon, losing to young rising player Jerzy Janowicz.

At Wimbledon, he made it to the quarterfinals in doubles.

His only singles tournament victory was in Winston-Salem, where he defeated Gaël Monfils, when the Frenchman had to retire in the second set. After that, Melzer was defeated in the first round of the US Open in straight sets by Evgeny Donskoy. He made it to the semifinals in Kuala Lumpur, losing to Portuguese João Sousa in three tight sets.

2014
Melzer pulled out of the Australian Open with a shoulder injury. At the ATP 500 Barcelona, he reached the third round by defeating Jerzy Janowicz, but lost to Philipp Kohlschreiber. At the Rome Masters he defeated John Isner and Marin Čilić to reach the third round, where he lost to Andy Murray. The Austrian won over David Goffin at Roland Garros to reach the second round, where he fell to Jo-Wilfried Tsonga. At s-Hertogenbosch, he defeated Fernando Verdasco in the quarterfinals and lost to Roberto Bautista Agut in the semifinals. Melzer defeated Guillermo García-López in the first round of the Paris Masters and lost again to Tsonga in the second round.

2015

Melzer failed to qualify for Wimbledon in 2015. Notably, he faced his younger brother Gerald in the first round qualifying and won in straight sets. Jürgen described it as the "worst tennis day of my life and I hope we will never play each other again.".

2016
In July, Melzer upset world No. 9, Dominic Thiem, at the Austrian Open after a long injury absence. This was his first victory over a top-10 player in over five years. In the next round, the quarterfinal, he lost to his brother Gerald.

2017
Melzer qualified for the Australian Open, but lost to the eventual champion Roger Federer in the first round.

2018: Retirement from singles

Melzer announced his retirement from the ATP Tour in singles, with the Vienna Open marking his final appearance. Ranked at world No. 426, he upset No. 22 Milos Raonic in the first round. This victory was his 350th and final career win, because he withdrew from the second round due to illness.

2019: First doubles title in 5 years
Melzer won the doubles title at the Sofia Open, partnering Nikola Mektić.

2020: ATP Finals runner-up in doubles
In October, Melzer announced his retirement from professional tennis after the 2021 Australian Open.

He qualified for the third time for the ATP Finals in doubles, this time with partner Édouard Roger-Vasselin. They reached the final, which they lost to Wesley Koolhof and Nikola Mektić.

2021: Retirement from tour
Contrary to his announcement, Melzer did not play at the Australian Open due to COVID-19 quarantine measures. Instead, he played in the doubles competitions of the other three Grand Slam tournaments where he each lost in the first round. He played his final tournament on the ATP Tour at the Vienna Open, where he partnered Alexander Zverev and also lost in the first round.

Performance timelines

Singles

Doubles
Current through the 2021 Vienna Open.

Mixed doubles

Significant finals

Grand Slam finals

Doubles: 2 (2 titles)

Mixed doubles: 1 (1 title)

Year-end championships

Doubles: 1 (1 runner-up)

Masters 1000 finals

Doubles: 2 (1 title, 1 runner-up)

ATP career finals

Singles: 13 (5 titles, 8 runner-ups)

Doubles: 37 (17 titles, 20 runner-ups)

ATP Challenger and ITF Futures finals

Singles: 11 (5–6)

Doubles: 10 (6–4)

Record against top 10 players
Melzer's match record against those who have been ranked in the top 10, with those who have been No. 1 in boldface.

  Ivan Ljubičić 5–0
  Mardy Fish 4–1
  Marat Safin 4–1
  Tommy Robredo 4–4
  Fabio Fognini 3–0
  David Goffin 3–2
  John Isner 3–2
  Rainer Schüttler 3–2
  Nicolás Almagro 3–3
  Juan Carlos Ferrero 3–4
  Fernando Verdasco 3–6
  Marin Čilić 3–7
  Radek Štěpánek 2–0
  Andre Agassi 2–1
  Roberto Bautista Agut 2–1
  Tommy Haas 2–1
  Milos Raonic 2–1
  Arnaud Clément 2–3
  Fernando González 2–2
  Nicolas Lapentti 2–2
  Stanislas Wawrinka 2–2
  Richard Gasquet 2–3
  Gilles Simon 2–4
  Tomáš Berdych 2–5
  Mikhail Youzhny 2–5
  David Ferrer 2–7
  Gastón Gaudio 1–0
  Sébastien Grosjean 1–0
  Wayne Ferreira 1–0
  Alexander Zverev 1–0
  Mario Ančić 1–1
  Marcos Baghdatis 1–1
  Pablo Carreño Busta 1–1
  Todd Martin 1–1
  David Nalbandian 1–1
  Mariano Puerta 1–1
  Dominic Thiem 1–1
  Janko Tipsarević 1–1
  Kevin Anderson 1–2
  Tim Henman 1–2
  Nicolás Massú 1–2
  Greg Rusedski 1–2
  Novak Djokovic 1–3
  Rafael Nadal 1–3
  Kei Nishikori 1–3
  Roger Federer 1–4
  Gaël Monfils 1–4
  Juan Martín del Potro 1–5
  Nikolay Davydenko 1–6
  Juan Mónaco 1–7
  Nicolas Kiefer 1–8
  Jonas Björkman 0–1
  James Blake 0–1
  Ernests Gulbis 0–1
  Carlos Moyá 0–1
  Diego Schwartzman 0–1
  Jack Sock 0–1
  Paradorn Srichaphan 0–1
  Guillermo Coria 0–2
  Grigor Dimitrov 0–2
  Mark Philippoussis 0–2
  Robin Söderling 0–2
  Guillermo Cañas 0–3
  Jiří Novák 0–3
  Jo-Wilfried Tsonga 0–6
  Lleyton Hewitt 0–7
  Andy Murray 0–7
  Andy Roddick 0–10

Wins over top 10 players
He has a 13–60 (.178) record against players who were, at the time the match was played, ranked in the top 10.

References

External links

 
 
 
 Official site
 Biofile with Jurgen Melzer
 ESPN: Jürgen Melzer match opponents and scores

1981 births
Living people
Australian Open (tennis) junior champions
Austrian male tennis players
Olympic tennis players of Austria
People from Deutsch-Wagram
Tennis players from Vienna
Tennis players at the 2004 Summer Olympics
Tennis players at the 2008 Summer Olympics
Tennis players at the 2012 Summer Olympics
Wimbledon champions
Wimbledon junior champions
Grand Slam (tennis) champions in mixed doubles
Grand Slam (tennis) champions in men's doubles
Grand Slam (tennis) champions in boys' singles
Grand Slam (tennis) champions in boys' doubles
Sportspeople from Lower Austria